Green Valley Creek is a  stream in Sonoma County, California, United States, which springs from the hills above the Bohemian Grove and is a tributary of the Russian River.

Course
It continues generally northward, crossing Green Valley Road a third time to reach a confluence with Atascadero Creek, then crossing Ross Station Road. After a westward jog, the creek resumes its northward course, crossing State Route 116 west of the town of Forestville. It follows Martinelli Road north to the town of Rio Dell, where it empties into the Russian River.

Gallery

See also
 Green Valley of Russian River Valley AVA
 List of watercourses in the San Francisco Bay Area

References

Rivers of Sonoma County, California
Rivers of Northern California
Tributaries of the Russian River (California)